Icon plc is a Nasdaq listed multinational clinical research organisation that provides consulting, clinical development and commercialization services for the pharmaceutical industry.

History
Icon was founded in Dublin, Ireland, by John Climax and Ronan Lambe in 1990. Since January 2010, Climax has held a position on the board of directors. Lambe retired from the board of directors in 2018.

Between 1991 and 1996, Icon opened offices in the United Kingdom, United States, and Japan. A year later, Icon shares started to be traded on Nasdaq.

In 2018, Icon won the PharmaTimes Clinical Researcher of the Year. Icon received 2019 Clinical Research Organization leadership awards in five categories, determined by Life Science Leader magazine and Industry Standard Research (ISR).

In March 2017, Steve Cutler was appointed Chief Executive Officer of Icon He had previously been with Quintiles South Africa, Sandoz AG, and Kendle Intl Inc, before joiníng Icon Clinical Research Services in 2011, and becoming Chief Operating Officer in 2014.

In 2013 the company was acquired by KKR, which listed the company on the Nasdaq in November 2014 and maintained shares until September 2019. In August 2017, the company acquired Conshohocken-based real-world healthcare data, analytics, and technology solutions company Symphony Health for US$530 million. PRA's 2018 revenue was US$2.87 billion. PRA was acquired by Icon on 1 July 2021.

Acquisitions
 2000: Icon acquired UK-based regulatory consultancy, YRCR Ltd.; Central Laboratory in New York; and bioanalytical consultancy, Pacific Research
 2002: Icon acquired clinical research provider, BPA.
 2003: Icon acquired Medeval, a UK-based Phase I facility, and US consulting firm, Globomax 
 2004: Icon acquired medical imaging specialist, Beacon Bioscience Inc.
 2006: Icon acquired outcomes research and health economics specialist, Ovation Research Group
 2007: Icon acquired European staffing group, DOCS International
 2008: Icon acquired US phase I provider, Healthcare Discoveries and US bioanalytical lab, Prevalere Life Sciences
 2009: ICON acquired Veeda Laboratories, a UK biomarker lab
 2010: Icon acquired Timaq Medical Imaging Inc.
 2011: Icon acquired Oxford Outcomes, an international health outcomes consultancy and Firecrest Clinical, a technology provider specialising in site performance and study management
 2012: Icon acquired PriceSpective, a global value strategy consultancy and Chinese CRO, BeijingWits
 2013: Icon acquired staffing and FSP providers, ClinForce and Assent and Akos, an EU provider of pharmacovigilance and drug safety services
 2014: Icon acquired Aptiv Solutions, a market leader in adaptive trial design and execution
 2015: Icon acquired MediMedia Pharma Solutions to enhance market access and scientific communications capabilities, and PMG Research Inc., an integrated network of clinical research sites in the US
 2016: Icon acquired Clinical Research Management Inc., to extend its presence in the government-sponsored research market
 2017: Icon acquired MAPI Group, thereby becoming the world’s second-largest provider of late-phase services
 2019: Icon acquired Symphony Clinical Research, a leading provider of at-home patient services and site-support services; MediNova, an integrated network of clinical research sites across EMEA; and MolecularMD, to enhance its laboratory offerings in molecular diagnostic testing and immunohistochemistry
 2021: Icon acquired PRA Health Sciences, a competitor offering clinical research services, for USD 12 billion.Upon completion of the transaction, PRA shareholders will own approximately 34 percent of the shares of the combined company and ICON shareholders will own approximately 66 percent.

See also
List of companies of Ireland

References

External links
Official website

Companies listed on the Nasdaq
Pharmaceutical companies of Ireland
Irish companies established in 1990
Kohlberg Kravis Roberts companies
Pharmaceutical companies established in 1990
Contract research organizations